Robert "Bobby" Donovan (1927 - 27 October 2009) was an Irish hurler who played as a left corner-forward for the Wexford senior team.

Born in Newbawn, County Wexford, Donovan first played competitive hurling during his schooling at St. Peter's College. He arrived on the inter-county scene at the age of twenty-three when he first linked up with the Wexford senior team, making his debut in the 1950 championship. Donovan later played with the Wexford junior hurling and football teams before returning to the senior ranks. During his career he won two Leinster medals.  He was an All-Ireland runner-up on one occasion.

His retirement came following Wexford's defeat by Cork in the 1954 championship.

Honours

Team

Wexford
Leinster Senior Hurling Championship (2): 1951, 1954

References

1927 births
2009 deaths
Wexford inter-county hurlers
People educated at St Peter's College, Wexford